Koothara is a 2014 Malayalam-language coming of age film directed by Srinath Rajendran and written by Vini Vishwa Lal. It stars Mohanlal,  Bharath, Sunny Wayne, and Tovino Thomas    The story, set in an untold period, focuses on three engineering students, Koobrin (Bharath), Tharun (Tovino Thomas), and Ram (Sunny Wayne), and their adventures during college time and post-college life.

The film was produced by Shahul Hammeed Marikar under the banner of Marikar Films and distributed by UTV Motion Pictures. The original songs and background score were composed by Gopi Sundar. The film was released on 13 June 2014, and received a mixed response from critics.

Plot

The story is about three friends whose heedless lifestyle take a twist after meeting a mysterious man who teaches them the real meaning of life.

The first earthquake – The preamble of an undying friendship

Koobrin, Tharun and Ram, a trio who met in college, enjoy their days carefree and aimless. They skip classes, fail in exams and survive their hectic engineering curriculum together. Tharun, coming from an economically weak background, carries the hope of his entire family where he has to either make success as an engineer or join his father's profession as a painter. He is bothered by something from an old relationship, which is unknown to his friends. Koobrin, from a middle-class family, fell for the promise of a motorcycle from his father if he agreed to join engineering, when he had no passion for it. Ram, hailing from a wealthy backdrop, has no passion for engineering either. The start of their friendship is marked by an earthquake and carried forward by their perpetual insouciant lifestyle. They are expelled from hostel and stay with their easy-going professor, Chandran sir and his pet dog, Koothara.

Ram fall in love with Shilpa, who works in a shop nearby, while Koobrin goes through numerous college flings. Sheistha, the last of Koobrin's conquest cheat him, which he finds out during the orchestration of their college fest. In front of the entire crowd, the trio confront her while he breaks-up with her, culminating in them getting expelled from college without a degree.

The reality of life strikes them now and it strike them hard. Tharun has no option, but to become a painter. Ram, being continuously demeaned at home, tries various jobs, failing in each. Koobrin is sent to seminary to make it as a priest. Their hopes hit rock-bottom to an extent that Tharun cannot even forgive a preschooler for a silly prank. The occasion of their professor Chandran sir's wedding proves no different, reminding them how much of a failure they have become compared to their classmates.

The second earthquake – Yellowtooth: Hope for a better future

Chandran sir's pep talk push the three to think of a better employment. They start an IT firm, named Yellowtooth, to try to excel in a field they are better equipped in. Stealing money from their homes, they make an exorbitant investment, even when they had zero managerial experience. Another earthquake marks the company's launch. Their innate profligacy and unfocused energies show them no success and it's only a matter of time before the company fell deep into debts.

The only upside to their unsuccessful venture, appears to be their befriending of the neighbour – Swathi, a single mother. It was Swathi's child, whose prank provoked Tharun earlier, which seems to be the reason for her initial friction with the group.

The third earthquake – AK47: Usthad and his nefarious plans

One by one, each employee quit the sinking ship. Losing hope in the company, the three are faced with the tough choice to make. They decide to shut down Yellowtooth. While drinking in a local bar they encounter a mysterious group of fishermen led by a strange man, on a silly matter. He challenge to meet the trio outside, where they are surprised with a friendly drinks offer. They drink through the night and he learns all about the trio. Also, he claims to be a cursed merman, which the trio does not take seriously. He take them out on his next fishing trip out in the ocean and suggest that the fishing business is profitable and there is a fishing boat available for sale, if they are interested. He assures huge profits, which can pay back the debts of purchase, if they can manage the money. With Swathi's help, they mortgage Shilpa's property to purchase the boat from Usthad Sali, an old ailing fisherman, without even seeing the boat.

The next day, they are shocked with the rusty old boat that they got for themselves. Aale-kolli (man-killer), or AK47, as it is popularly known, is believed to be haunted and so far caused 47 deaths, at least one in each of its voyages. The mysterious man is none other than Usthad Sali, the owner of the boat. He tricked them into buying his boat and the boat is not even worth one-tenth what they paid.

With a huge mortgage to pay and no other way out, they are forced to try their luck with AK47. The trio along with Koothara, their pet dog, restore the boat and set out on their maiden voyage marked by another earthquake. Not only do they not catch any fish, they are also met with the fury of the sea, in a thunderstorm that night. Luck lets them escape with their life and an upright boat. Stranded in the sea, their calls to shore for help is answered only by Usthad, who says it is his revenge for the unfinished business from their first meeting. Famished, they are now faced with either slow starvation to death or suicide using the poison that Usthad had left for them on board.

Also, Tharun confess to his friends of his past affair with Swathi.

No more earthquakes – The trio triumphs

They decide not to give up – the way they had always done so. They try and fix the boat and continue to fish. They manage to capture quite a few and return ashore. Usthad had left the shore, with their money left back for them.

Knowing nothing of the trade, they had returned from the sea, alive and unharmed. They decide to achieve the best in what they know. They restart Yellowtooth and gradually climb to success. Ram marry Shilpa and Tharun marry Swathi. Koobrin starts a relationship with an old classmate, Roshni. A prank, placing a microphone in Tharun's room on his wedding night, reveals to his friends that he is the father of Swathi's child.

The end credits show the story being narrated by Koothara, the pet dog, to his son and Usthad is shown swimming in some distant seas with two other mermaids, having finally freed himself from the curse.

Cast

Mohanlal as Siren Semiramis Aegean Derketoa aka Ustad Saali 
Bharath as Koobrin Anthony  / Kalikkaran
Tovino Thomas as Tharun Moorthy
Sunny Wayne as Ram
Bhavana as Swathi
Janani Iyer as Noora
Gauthami Nair as Roshni
Shritha Sivadas as Shilpa
Madhurima as Sheistha
Josekutty Valiyakallumkal as Chandran Sir
Anjali Nair as Priya Miss
Baburaj as Principal
Ranjini as Ram's mother
Neena Kurup as Ammini
Sasi Kalinga as Sulaiman
Master Elhan Riyaz Shah as son of Tharun and Swati
Arun Benny as Kannan
 Bibin Perumballikunneal as Azhar
Prem Kumar as himself
Subbalakshmi as Valyammachi
Sunil Sukhada as House Owner
Abi as Thufailikka
Kollam Thulasi as Bar Manager
Aneesh Gopal as Tharuns Friend 
Lishoy as Koobrin's father
Urmila Unni as Tharun's mother
Nilambur Ayisha as Muslim Lady
 Liju Krishna as Saalis Gang Member
 Arun Vishwam as Employer in Bar
Pratheesh Nair

Production
Bharath was signed as one of the lead actors for the film. Ranjini was cast for an important role. Madhurima stated that she would essay the role of Shaista, an NRI in the film. Shritha Sivadas said that her character Shilpa was a simple village girl and that she was paired opposite Sunny Wayne, who played a college student.

The shooting started at Calicut University Institute of Engineering and Technology, Thenhipalam on 25 September.  The film was also shot at Calicut, Ernakulam, Thodupuzha and Andaman and Nicobar Islands.

Kootharas poster, designed by YellowTooth, was shortlisted for International Movie Poster Awards (IMP Awards).

Soundtrack

The soundtrack features  songs composed by Gopi Sundar and Thakara .The lyrics were written by  Hari Narayanan, Thakara and San Jaimt .

 Track list

Reception

Critical response
The film received negative reviews. Times of India rated it 2.5/5 and said "It cannot be called an enjoyable movie despite a rich verve of youthful energy that is pumped into it. Often it is low, degrading and utterly disappointing rarely eliciting any real laughter."

Gayathry of Oneindia.in said, "Koothara is a one time watchable flick. There are lot to see and laugh during the first half but, the movie disappoints during the second half and reviewed the movie 2/5."

Raj Vikaram of metromatinee said, "Negative title will only serve to accentuate the movie's collapse not that 'koothara', is most badly made movie which is insufficient to the hilt. But its attempt to be a surprise packet, doesn't bear fruit beyond a point."

Deccan Chronicle stated " Koothara is good in parts, just like a use-and-throw razor" and appreciated the technical aspects of the movie.

The IB Times applauded the cinematography and Mohanlal's cameo.

Box office

References

External links
 

Indian thriller films
2014 thriller films
2010s Malayalam-language films